Grace and Frankie is an American comedy television series created by Marta Kauffman and Howard J. Morris for Netflix. The series stars Jane Fonda and Lily Tomlin as the eponymous Grace Hanson and Frankie Bergstein, two aging women who form an unlikely friendship after their husbands reveal they are in love with each other and plan to get married. Sam Waterston, Martin Sheen, Brooklyn Decker, Ethan Embry, June Diane Raphael, and Baron Vaughn co-star in supporting roles.

The series premiered on Netflix on May 8, 2015. The second through sixth seasons were released from 2016 to 2020. The seventh and final season premiered on August 13, 2021 with four episodes, and the final twelve released on April 29, 2022.

Grace and Frankie received mixed reviews upon its debut, but its second and subsequent seasons have been met with a largely positive reception from television critics. It has received several accolades, including five Primetime Emmy Award nominations for Outstanding Lead Actress in a Comedy Series and a Golden Globe Award nomination for Best Actress – Television Series Musical or Comedy.

Premise
The series follows Grace Hanson, a sharp-tongued, retired cosmetics mogul, and Frankie Bergstein, a quirky artist and hippie, whose long-term husbands, Robert and Sol, are successful divorce lawyers in San Diego, California. Grace and Frankie's lives are turned upside down when Robert and Sol announce they are in love with each other and are leaving their wives. Now the women, who have never particularly liked each other, are forced to live together as they navigate family drama, medical scares, business ventures, and romantic turmoil on their road to becoming best friends.

Cast and characters

Main
 Jane Fonda as Grace Hanson (née Purcell), a no-nonsense cosmetics mogul who likes to drink martinis and enjoys coming up with clever comments and insults. After years of conflict, she and Frankie have become best friends. Grace is also mother to Brianna and Mallory, grandmother to Madison, Macklin and the twins, ex-wife of Robert and later, of Nick.
 Lily Tomlin as Frances "Frankie" Bergstein (née Mengela), an artist who "rides her own wave" and often finds herself in situations that require Grace to rescue her. Creative and spiritual, Frankie cares very deeply about her loved ones and would do anything to protect them. She is Grace's best friend, Bud & Coyote's adoptive mother, Faith's grandmother, Allison's mother-in-law and Sol's ex-wife.
 Sam Waterston as Sol Bergstein, a gentle ex-divorce lawyer turned activist for gay rights. Sol was married to Frankie for 40 years, but for half of his marriage he was in love with Robert, and they ultimately came out to their wives. Sol is also Robert's husband, Bud and Coyote's adoptive father, Faith's grandfather, Allison's father-in-law and Frankie's ex-husband.
 Martin Sheen as Robert Hanson, a successful divorce lawyer who threw himself into theatre following retirement. He was married to Grace for 40 years, and they had two daughters, Brianna and Mallory. Robert began to fall in love with Sol, and the feeling was mutual. Robert is Sol's husband, Grace's ex-husband, Brianna and Mallory's father, grandfather to Macklin, Madison and the twins and close friend to Peter.
 Brooklyn Decker as Mallory Hanson, second-born daughter to Grace and Robert, younger sister to Brianna and mother to Madison, Macklin and the twins. She is also stepdaughter to Nick and Sol. At the start of the series, she is married to Mitch. In season 3 the two divorce. 
 Ethan Embry as Coyote Bergstein, first-born adoptive child of Frankie and Sol, older brother to Bud, uncle to Faith and husband of Jessica. Coyote is a recovering addict and is a middle school music teacher.
 June Diane Raphael as Brianna Hanson, the first-born child of Robert and Grace who is now the CEO of Say Grace, a successful cosmetics company that Grace gave her after retiring. Sharp, impatient, and fiery, Brianna resembles her mother personality-wise more than her sister, Mallory. Bri is also the girlfriend (later fiancée) to Barry, aunt to Mallory's children, arch rival to Lauren and stepdaughter to Nick and Sol.
 Baron Vaughn as Nwabudike "Bud" Bergstein, second-born adoptive child of Frankie and Sol, younger brother to Coyote, father to Faith, and Allison's husband. Bud is a lawyer, and, similar to Brianna, now runs the law firm left to him by his father, Sol, after the latter retired.

Recurring

Episodes

Production

Development
In March 2014, Netflix finalized a deal for a 13-episode straight-to-series order for Grace and Frankie, with Jane Fonda and Lily Tomlin attached to star in the lead roles. The series was written and created by Marta Kauffman and Howard J. Morris, who also serve as executive producers alongside Fonda, Tomlin, Paula Weinstein and Tate Taylor, and Skydance Productions' Dana Goldberg, David Ellison, and Marcy Ross. It premiered on May 8, 2015, with all 13 episodes released simultaneously.

On May 26, 2015, Netflix renewed the series for a second season which premiered on May 6, 2016. On December 10, 2015, the series was renewed for a third season which premiered on March 24, 2017. On April 12, 2017, the series was renewed for a fourth season, which premiered on January 19, 2018. On February 15, 2018, the series was renewed for a fifth season, which premiered on January 18, 2019. The sixth season was announced on January 15, 2019, and premiered on January 15, 2020.

On September 4, 2019, the series was renewed for a seventh and final season consisting of 16 episodes. On March 12, 2020, production was halted on the final season, due to the COVID-19 pandemic. Jane Fonda indicated in an interview that production planned to resume filming in January 2021. Production was delayed again and resumed in June 2021. The seventh and final season premiered on August 13, 2021, when the first four episodes of the season were made available. The remaining 12 episodes of the season was released on April 29, 2022.

Casting
Casting announcements began in June 2014, with Martin Sheen cast in the role of Robert, Grace's husband. The following month, Sam Waterston was cast in the role of Sol, Frankie's husband. June Diane Raphael and Baron Vaughn were then added to the cast, with Raphael cast in the role of Brianna, Grace and Robert's elder daughter, who rebels against Grace's decorum. Vaughn signed onto the role of Nwabudike, Frankie and Sol's son. Shortly afterwards, Ethan Embry and Brooklyn Decker were cast in the remaining roles on the series. Embry joined in the role of Coyote, Frankie and Sol's recovering drug-addicted son, while Decker signed onto the role of Mallory, Grace and Robert's younger daughter. In October 2015, it was announced Sam Elliott would appear in the second season as Grace's love interest. In April 2017, it was reported Lisa Kudrow will appear in the fourth season as Sheree, Grace's manicurist. In February 2018, the same day as the fifth season was commissioned, RuPaul was confirmed to appear in the fifth season as a rival of Grace and Frankie. Dolly Parton was confirmed to appear in a guest starring role in the final season, making it a full reunion of the cast of 9 to 5.

Filming
Production on season one of Grace and Frankie began in Los Angeles, California, in early August 2014, and ended in late November. Production on season two of the series began in July 2015, and ended in November the same year. Production on final season ended in November 2021.

Reception

Critical response

The first season of Grace and Frankie received mixed reviews from critics. On the review aggregator website Rotten Tomatoes it has a rating of 57%, based on 40 reviews, with an average rating of 6.42/10. The site's critical consensus reads, "Grace and Frankie'''s stellar cast adds an undeniable appeal, although its sloppy dialogue and clichéd sitcom setup will still leave most viewers wanting." On Metacritic the season has a score of 58 out of 100, based on 27 critics, indicating "mixed or average reviews".

The second season received a more positive reception from critics. On Rotten Tomatoes, it has a rating of 91%, based on 11 reviews, with an average rating of 7.34/10. The site's critical consensus reads, "Grace & Frankie gets better with age in a heartwarming, character driven second season full of humor that is both fun and obnoxious." On Metacritic, the season has a score of 62 out of 100, based on 6 critics, indicating "generally favourable reviews".

The third, fourth, and fifth season each have 100% ratings on Rotten Tomatoes with average ratings of 7.5/10, 8.42/10, and 6.33/10 respectively. The site's critical consensus for season five reads, "Five seasons in, Grace & Frankie remain blissfully at the top of their game, thanks to Jane Fonda and Lily Tomlin's undeniable bond."

Accolades

Controversy
After the series' debut, Fonda and Tomlin expressed displeasure once it became public that their salaries were just equal to those of Waterston and Sheen, even though "the show is not 'Sol and Robert', it's 'Grace and Frankie,'" in the words of Tomlin, and contended this constituted a significant pay inequity. Shortly thereafter, Waterston and Sheen went on the record to support their co-stars' demands for a salary increase, with Waterston being quoted as saying: "I think they're being cheated". After fans of the series gathered nearly 200,000 signatures on a petition protesting the disparity, the two actresses issued a public statement backing away from criticism, saying: "This just reminds us to be mindful of how things come across in interviews. We appreciate everyone's support and the attention to this issue, but the structure of Grace and Frankie is fair, and we couldn't be happier to work with Skydance, Netflix and the great cast of this show." Fonda and Tomlin made a statement to TheWrap'' clarifying they were never displeased with the salaries to begin with and they had in actuality "made a joke in an interview about our salaries, which was taken out of context."

Home media

References

External links
 
 

2010s American LGBT-related comedy television series
2010s American single-camera sitcoms
2015 American television series debuts
2020s American LGBT-related comedy television series
2020s American single-camera sitcoms
2022 American television series endings
Bisexuality-related television series
English-language Netflix original programming
Fictional LGBT couples
Gay-related television shows
Salary controversies in television
Television duos
Television series about old age
Television series by Skydance Television
Television series created by Marta Kauffman
Television shows set in San Diego